Inner City Health Associates (ICHA) is Canada's largest community healthcare organization for unhoused people and is based in Toronto.

Organization 
In 2014, Inner City Health Associates' team included over 65 medical doctors, including 29 family doctors and 32 psychiatrists. In 2014, ICHA provided healthcare services at over 40 shelters, drop in centers, street-outreach teams, and housing agencies. In 2010 ICHA provided 14,400 hours of care to 1,700 people.

Their work is primarily funded by the Ontario Health Insurance Plan.

History 
Inner City Health Associates was created after a advocacy campaign by doctors and administrators at St Michael's Hospital to the Ontario Ministry of Health to fund the delivery of healthcare in ways that addressed the specific challenges of delivering healthcare to people experiencing homelessness. The negotiations resulted in the agreement of the first variation from the standard physician payment plan in Canada. The organization was started in 2005 and officially incorporated in 2011.

The model of care was designed with patients, families, and other local stakeholders. ICHA works in partnership with donors and health policy-makers to focus on systems change, focused on community goals and barriers faced by patients and healthcare workers.

Activities 
ICHA primarily provides preventative health care, management of chronic, complex and acute illness, and mental health services. ICHA also runs specific programs that provide multi disciplinary street outreach services, and help shelter staff with data management  

During the COVID-19 pandemic, it operated an isolation facility for people who were homeless, although disagreements between stakeholders initially delayed opening. The centre operated with difficulties due to its design. The centre received a $490,000 grant from the Public Health Agency of Canada's Immunization Partnership Fund to increase COVID-19 vaccine uptake among the homeless population in Toronto shelters.

Challenges 
The work of ICHA faces barriers that include tension between healthcare providers and community-based social service providers. Tension is exacerbated as both groups are governed by different patient privacy legislation in Ontario.

Notable associates 

 Leslie Shanks
 Naheed Dosani

See also 

 Homelessness in Canada
 Covenant House Toronto
 Seaton House
 Canadian Observatory on Homelessness
 Ontario Coalition Against Poverty

References 

Organizations based in Toronto
Homelessness in Canada
Homelessness charities
2005 establishments in Ontario